Ron Johnson (born October 23, 1979) was a three-time All-PSAC Western Division selection at Shippensburg University from 1999 to 2002.  He finished his career with 158 total tackles, including 35 for loss and 18 sacks while earning All-PSAC Western Division First Team honors as a senior in 2002.  He was also named All-PSAC Western Division Second Team in 1999 and 2000.  Johnson's 18.0 career sacks still rank fifth in school history.  He spent part of one season with the Philadelphia Eagles, appearing in three games.  In late-2006 he signed with the Arena Football League's Philadelphia Soul.  In September 2005, Ron was the first overall draft pick in the NFL Europe Free Agent Draft by the Hamburg Sea Devils but did not play in NFLE.

Johnson has been the defensive line coach at Red Lion Area Senior High School in Red Lion, PA since 2012. Two years prior in 2010, he founded and continues to run the Rising Stars Football Academy, a non-contact football camp for football players who play at the High School Varsity/JV, Freshman, Junior High, and Midget football levels. He runs it with a vision for a camp for players of all levels to teach advanced techniques and skills to help players take their game to the next level. He also wanted to incorporate a focus on education, leadership, and student-athlete development.

External links
Shippensburg Football Tribute Page

1979 births
Living people
American football defensive ends
Shippensburg Red Raiders football players
Philadelphia Eagles players
Players of American football from Pennsylvania
Philadelphia Soul players